Rice yellow mottle virus (RYMV) is a plant pathogenic virus, belonging to the genus Sobemovirus. The genome is a positive-sense single strand RNA of 4450 nucleotides in length and is not polyadenylated. It was first reported in Kenya in 1966 in one of Africa's first cultivation intensification schemes, due to RYMV's association with intensification, but DNA analysis of its evolutionary history shows it to have evolved in East Africa in the 19th century. Since its identification in Kenya it has been detected in many countries in sub-Saharan Africa. It has also been detected in Central Africa, but has yet to be seen outside the continent.  The genomic organization of RYMV is most similar to that of Cocksfoot mottle sobemovirus. RYMV is one of the better-studied plant-virus pathosystems.

Virology

Structure 
RYMV is a single-stranded positive-sense RNA virus. There is a high level of genetic diversity with the RYMV nucleotides, which is roughly 14%. RYMV is a sobemovirus.

Impact on plants 
RYMV has a massive impact on rice crops. Streaking, mottling, discoloration and malformation of leaves as well as death of infected young plants are all typical signs of RYMV infection.  Crop losses can be 25–100%. It is believed that RYMV has begun to spread since the introduction of the exotic rice (Oryza sativa) from Asia into the African continent. Indigenous rices that are from the African area tend to be more tolerant of the virus. The natural host of the virus tends to remain in the Oryzeae tribe of plants.  The virus only impacts a few plant species, including certain rice species and wild grasses. The only way for plants to be confirmed of having RYMV is by performing a serological test.

Symptoms of infection 
Younger seedlings (3–4 leaf growth stage) are the most susceptible – older plants generally exhibit less obvious foliar symptoms and less stunting than younger siblings. Symptoms appear initially as yellow-green linear spots on the base of the youngest leaves. As the infection grows the spots expand parallel to leaf veins and appear as yellow or orange streaks; these can vary in width, but can be continuous up to 10 cm. 

Affected plants have yellow or orange leaves at the early stage of the crop. In severe cases, leaves roll up and dry. Other symptoms are stunting, reduced tillering and poor panicle filling. This results in low or no seed production and poor grain quality.

Transmission 
RYMV located in the rice husks in the plants. The virus is transmissible by animals, by wind-mediated leaf contact, and by abiotic factors (e.g. irrigation water). It can be transmitted by leaf beetles or rats, or from plant to plant through leaf debris, empty rice spikelets, intertwining roots, leaf contact, rice stubble, contaminated hands, and from closely spaced plants. This virus is not seed-borne, nor is it transmitted by nematodes. Long-horned grasshoppers (Conocephalus) were found to be a possible vector of RYMV in Uganda.

Adaptability and resistance 
A few rice cultivars exhibit a high resistance to RYMV characterized by an absence of symptoms and no viral detection. The inheritance of this high resistance is recessive. The resistance gene RYMV1 was identified as an eIF(iso)4G gene. Four rymv1 resistance alleles have been characterized, one in O. sativa (rymv1-2) and three in O. glaberrima cultivars (rymv1-3, rymv1-4, rymv1-5). Resistance of rymv1–3 is caused by a deletion of codons 322–324 in the same domain of eIF(iso)4G.

Management

Prevention 
Resistant and tolerant varieties are available.

Using nursery sites which haven't been infected previously or direct sowing in the field can also help prevent the spread of the virus.

CABI recommends planting the crop as early as possible can avoid the peak period of insect vectors of the virus. In addition, synchronising the planting in different fields can prevent the virus from spreading to younger crops.

Maintaining weeds to control other hosts of the virus and clearing bushes around fields to control breeding sites for insect vectors can also prevent RYMV spread.

Sanitation procedures can reduce the spread of RYMV. CABI recommends cleaning weeds from irrigation canals and around rice fields, especially during the off season, to remove the virus and its insect vectors  will remove the virus and insect vectors. Cleaning of farm machinery can reduce spread prevent mechanical spread. This also applies to cleaning any farm machinery after each use.

Control 
RYMV will completely kill susceptible varieties; if detected, removing infected plants and destroying them can prevent further spread. It has also been recommended by CABI to reduce the application of fertiliser on infected plants.

There are no chemical control methods to directly stop the spread of RYMV. However, there are available insecticides to control vectors of the virus in some countries; suitable chemicals vary depending on country specific guidelines.

Epidemiology 
 RYMV is still considered an "emerging" disease because there is still a great deal of range expansion ongoing and expected in the future.

Sources

References

External links 
ICTVdB - The Universal Virus Database: Rice yellow mottle virus
Family Groups - The Baltimore Method

Sobemoviruses
Viral plant pathogens and diseases